David K. Naugle (1952 – 2021) was an author and professor. He was considered an expert on the Christian worldview.

Naugle was the head of the philosophy department at Dallas Baptist University. He was a supporter of Amyraldism and Neo-Calvinism.

During his time at Dallas Baptist University, he began a weekly lecture series called the “Friday Symposium”. It featured presentations by DBU's faculty, students, and off-campus lecturers on a broad range of topics. He also began the annual “Summer Institute for Christian Scholarship”, a ten-week faculty enrichment program for Dallas Baptist University's professors.

David K. Naugle died on Friday, June 11, 2021.

Works
He authored Worldview: The History of a Concept in 2003 which was selected by Christianity Today Magazine as the "Book of the Year" in its theology and ethics category. The Peking University Press has since translated it into Chinese for a release in 2006. Naugle also wrote Reordered Loves, Reordered Lives: Learning the Deep Meaning of Happiness and Philosophy: A Student's Guide.

Education
 Systematic Theology, Th.D. (Dallas Theological Seminary)
 Humanities, Ph.D. (University of Texas at Arlington)

Footnotes

External links
 Curriculum Vita
 Extended bio
 Online academic papers by David Naugle
 Naugle's speaking schedule

1952 births
2021 deaths
Calvinist and Reformed philosophers
Religious leaders from Texas
Dallas Theological Seminary alumni
American evangelicals